David Leslie Taylor (22 August 1946 – 26 December 2009) was a British Labour Co-operative politician who served as Member of Parliament (MP) for North West Leicestershire from 1997 until his death in 2009.

Biography
David Taylor was born in Ashby de la Zouch. He went to Heather County Primary School near Coalville, Ashby Boy's Grammar School (now known as Ashby School) and Leicester Polytechnic.

Career
At Leicester Polytechnic, he became a Chartered Public Finance Accountant in 1970. At the Open University, he gained a BA in Maths and Computing in 1974. During this time, he wrote the first CASCAID computer program that evolved into the modern-day Kudos and Adult Directions programs. Before being elected as a Member of Parliament, Taylor was an accountant and the computer applications manager for Leicestershire County Council from 1977 to 1997.

He founded Safeguard the Quality of the Rural Environment (SQUARE) and had been a parish councillor, churchwarden of St John the Baptist church in Heather, President of Heather Sparkenhoe Cricket Club, magistrate and school governor.

Religion
Taylor was a committed Christian and described himself as an ecumenical Anglican.

Personal life
Taylor married Pamela Caunt on 13 September 1969 in Loughborough. The couple had four daughters (and one son, deceased), one granddaughter and one grandson.

Death
On Boxing Day 2009, whilst walking with his family at Calke Abbey, Derbyshire, Taylor suffered a massive heart attack. He was taken by ambulance to Queens Hospital in Burton-on-Trent hospital, but paramedics were unable to save him. The event occurred during his day off while spending time with his family; he had previously announced that he would not run for re-election due to the high workload.

Parliamentary career
He first contested his seat in 1992, achieving a 5.9% swing compared to the national 3.6% swing to Labour.

Taylor's views were on the left of the Labour Party. He was widely regarded as one of the parliamentary rebels and had rebelled on 7.2% of votes since June 2001. 

As Chair of the All-Party Group on Smoking and Health, he was particularly active on the issue of tobacco control and a Member of the Chairmen's Panel Committee and a Member of the Environment, Food and Rural Affairs Committee.

Taylor described it as "a real privilege" to win the title of Commons Backbencher of the Year 2007 in the Annual Awards organised by Sky TV and The House Magazine and decided by a ballot of all 646 MPs. His citation described him as "an indefatigable campaigner, constant attender and independent-minded".

He was one of only a small number of Labour MPs to hold an anti-abortion position.

Expenses

Prior to this, he opened his complete "unredacted" expenses file to the local newspaper, the Leicester Mercury.

Following the new emergency interim rules announced on 19 May 2009 by the Speaker, which say that furniture should no longer be claimed for, Taylor voluntarily elected to apply those new rules retrospectively in his case for the life of the parliament and had since made a refund based on the fully funded purchase price of all such items.

Standing down
At the May 2008 meeting of his Constituency Labour Party, Taylor announced he would not be standing for re-election at the next general election. Taylor died at the end of 2009, before the general election. As an election had to be called within four months, no by-election was held, and at the 2010 general election, Taylor's former seat was gained by Andrew Bridgen of the Conservative Party.

References

External links
 Website of David Taylor, MP 
 
 BBC Politics page 
 Guardian Unlimited Politics – Ask Aristotle: David Taylor MP
 TheyWorkForYou.com – David Taylor MP
 Open Rights Group – David Taylor MP
 Blog

News items
 David Taylor: Face wash included in claims list
 MP admits 'lack of judgement' over claims
 Seizing gypsies vehicles in October 2007
 Pledging to refund £5 to every constituent in November 2004
 School governors in January 1999

1946 births
2009 deaths
People from Ashby-de-la-Zouch
Alumni of the Open University
Alumni of De Montfort University
English accountants
English Anglicans
Labour Co-operative MPs for English constituencies
UK MPs 1997–2001
UK MPs 2001–2005
UK MPs 2005–2010
European democratic socialists
Anglican socialists
English Christian socialists
20th-century English businesspeople
British Eurosceptics